Max Colby (born 1990) is an artist known for her work in textiles, sculpture, installation, embroidery, and painting. Her work highlights precarity and vulnerability through a consistent investigation of ritual objects, most often, funereal. Touching on such ceremonial iconography, the artist constructs objects which subvert the aesthetics of patriarchal systems.  To her, Colby's process is about undoing the conditioning of  "inherited cultural understandings of binary gender, as well as class and taste." Colby's elaborate work in installation utilizing beads, faux flowers, sequins, ribbons, fabric and jewelry is a flamboyant celebration of self-expression thorugh the artist's meticulous process of utopian construction of a universe.

Early life 
Colby was born in West Palm Beach, Florida. She studied at the School of the Museum of Fine Arts, Boston and received a BFA in 2012.

Exhibitions

2011 
 Arches Show, Danforth Museum of Art, Framingham, MA
 Concepts of the Self, MFA Horticulture Library, Boston, MA
 Exchange, Prints from Frans Masereel, SMFA, Boston, MA;  
 Cranbrook Academy of Art, Bloomfield Hills, MI;  
 Edinburgh College of Art, Edinburgh, Scotland;  
 Antwerp Academy of Arts, Antwerp, Belgium

2012 
 New Prints/2012 Summer selected by Shahzia Sikander, IPCNY, New York, NY
 H x W x D x T, Yes.Oui.Si Gallery, Boston, MA
 Slivers, B.A.G. Gallery, SMFA, Boston, MA
 The Artist’s Voice, Resnikoff Gallery, Boston, MA
 Celebrating the Transformative Power of Art, Doric Hall, Massachusetts Statehouse, Boston, MA
 Transatlantic Fun-O-Pack, Edinburgh College of Art, Edinburgh, Scotland;  
 SMFA, Boston, MA

2013 
 Crafted, TEMP Gallery, New York, NY
 Prints on Prince, Crossman Gallery, Whitewater, WI

2014 
Vernissage: 100, Greenpoint Gallery, Brooklyn, NY

2017 
Stitch: Beyond Function, Henry Zarrow Center for Art and Education, Tulsa, OK

2019 
 Harvest: A Convening of Materiality and Form curated by Sidel & McElwreath, ChaShaMa, New York, NY
 No Trigger Warning curated by Bill Arning, Flatland Gallery, Houston, TX
 Figuring the Floral, Wave Hill, Bronx, NY
 A Body of Work curated by Shehab Awad, Jane Lombard Gallery, New York, NY
 Rijswijk Textile Biennial, Museum Rijswijk, Rijswijk, Netherlands
 Lobster Dinner curated by Will Hutnick, Trestle Gallery, Brooklyn, NY
 Soft Grit, LoBo Gallery, Brooklyn, NY

2020 
 Tableau Vivant curated by Anna Cone and Victoria Udondian, SPRING/BREAK Art Show, New York, NY

2021 
 Home, Sugar Hill Children’s Museum of Art and Storytelling, New York, NY
 Uncommon Ground, Shoshana Wayne Gallery, Los Angeles, CA
 Fringe, Denny Dimin Gallery, New York, NY
 Above & Below, Shoshana Wayne Gallery, Los Angeles, CA
 Cuir curated by Chiachio & Giannone, Isabel Croxatto Galería, Santiago, Chile
 Dissolution, Leslie-Lohman Museum of Art, New York, NY

2022 
 Art in Focus, Rockefeller Center, presented in partnership with Art Production Fund, New York, NY
 Radical Enchantments, Aicon, New York, NY

References 

1990 births
Living people
21st-century American women artists
Artists from Florida
American LGBT artists
People from West Palm Beach, Florida
School of the Museum of Fine Arts at Tufts alumni
Wikipedia Student Program
American embroiderers